Bright Light Ballads is the debut solo album by English singer-songwriter Howard Eliott Payne, formerly of the Liverpool band The Stands.

The album was produced by Ethan Johns (Kings Of Leon, Ryan Adams etc.) and released digitally on 14 April 2009, reaching No. 14 in the ITunes album chart. A limited physical CD release was made available on 4 May 2009.

Track listing
All songs written by Howard Eliott Payne.
 "Dangling Threads" – 2:44
 "Come Down Easy" – 4:09
 "Seven Years" – 4:14
 "Until Morning" – 3:51
 "When Summer Has Passed" – 3:09
 "I Just Want to Spend Some Time with You" – 3:27
 "You Can't Hurt Me Anymore" – 3:11
 "Walk by My Side" – 3:27
 "Underneath the Sun Rising" – 3:18
 "Lay Down Your Tune for Me" – 3:14

Personnel
 Howard Eliott Payne – vocals, guitar

Production
 Ethan Johns – producer
 Bob Ludwig – mastering

Additional musicians
 Candie Payne – backing vocals
 Dean Ravera – bass guitar, double bass, backing vocals
 Scott Marmion – pedal steel guitar
 Nicole Terry – violin

Release history

References

External links
 
 

2009 debut albums
Albums produced by Ethan Johns
Howie Payne albums